Xuất Hóa may refer to several places in Vietnam, including:

Xuất Hóa, Bắc Kạn, a ward of Bắc Kạn city
, a rural commune of Lạc Sơn District